Erika Amato (born December 7, 1969) is an American singer and actress and a founding member of the band Velvet Chain.

Early life and education
Amato was born in Plainfield, New Jersey, and grew up in nearby Mountainside. She started playing and performing music at the age of three. Amato attended the all-girls Kent Place School (receiving the Drama Award upon graduation) and then Vassar College, earning a Bachelor of Arts degree in drama. While at Vassar, she performed in the Music Department's a cappella group, the Madrigals, and in the student-managed coeducational a cappella group, Matthew's Minstrels.

Career 
After Vassar, Amato moved to Los Angeles to pursue an acting career and was cast as a guest star on popular TV series Quantum Leap, garnering her a SAG card. In the mid-1990s, she founded Velvet Chain with her now-deceased husband, Jeff Stacy. The indie band was most famous for appearances on the TV series Buffy the Vampire Slayer and the subsequent soundtrack album on TVT Records. The band has also self-released several albums on its own label, Freak Productions, and members continue to write and record material.

The aging songstress is still acting and has relocated to New York City, where she has been in numerous productions, including the Off-Broadway musicals The Sphinx Winx and Signs of Life. She has also appeared in several films over the years, including the lead in indie film A Couple of Days and Nights and in musicals throughout North America, including the First National Tour of Flashdance the Musical, Into the Woods (Ocean State Theatre Company - Broadway World Award Nomination for Best Actress in a Musical), Sleeping Beauty Wakes (Center Theatre Group - Ovation Award Nomination for Best Featured Actress in a Musical), Paint Your Wagon (Geffen Playhouse), Nine (Chance Theater - OC Weekly Award Nomination for Best Actress in a Musical), 42nd Street (Welk Resort Theatre), and Anything Goes (Candlelight Pavilion - Inland Theatre League Awards Nomination for Best Actress in a Musical).

She also does voice work for TV shows and films, most recently for the PBS animated series Danger Rangers and Disney feature film Enchanted.

Amato appeared on the TV competition Win Ben Stein's Money, and won.

Filmography

Film

Television

References

External links
 
 
 
 

1969 births
American film actresses
American women singers
American stage actresses
American television actresses
Actresses from New Jersey
Kent Place School alumni
Vassar College alumni
Living people
People from Mountainside, New Jersey
Musicians from Plainfield, New Jersey
21st-century American women